Withybush General Hospital is a district general hospital in Haverfordwest, Pembrokeshire, Wales. It is managed by Hywel Dda University Health Board.

History
The hospital started life in 1942 as a wartime hospital for wounded soldiers. It was rebuilt between 1973 and 1978 and officially re-opened on 15 June 1979. A new Emergency and Urgent Care centre was opened in 2010.

There were concerns about the hospital's long term prospects, leading to protests in 2010.

In September 2014 a new renal dialysis unit run by Fresenius Medical Care Renal Services Ltd was opened at the hospital, with a contract to run for at least 7 years.

As part of the reorganisation of acute services in Wales a 24/7 inpatient paediatric service was to be provided at West Wales General Hospital from October 2014.  Withybush was to have a new 12-hour paediatric ambulatory care unit.

In April 2018 plans were announced to downgrade Withybush to a community hospital, with plans for a new hospital to be built near the Pembrokeshire-Carmarthenshire border. A demonstration through Haverfordwest and other protests were held against the downgrading and loss of Accident and Emergency facilities.

Services
Services offered or in development include inpatient facilities for palliative care, oncology and haematology patients.

References

External links
 Official website

Hospital buildings completed in 1978
Hospitals in Pembrokeshire
Hospitals established in 1979
NHS hospitals in Wales
Haverfordwest
Hywel Dda University Health Board